The Memorial Day Miracle is a game-winning three-point field goal by Sean Elliott in Game 2 of the 1999 Western Conference Finals between the Portland Trail Blazers and the San Antonio Spurs at the Alamodome in San Antonio, Texas, on May 31, 1999, Memorial Day.

The play
Damon Stoudamire of the Trail Blazers was fouled with 12 seconds left in the fourth quarter. He hit one of two free throws to make the Trail Blazers' lead 85–83. The Spurs called a timeout to advance the ball to half-court. After the timeout, Spurs guard Mario Elie inbounded the ball past a diving Augmon to forward Sean Elliott.

Elliott caught the inbounds pass near the sideline. He stayed on his toes while turning to shoot a three-pointer, careful not to set his heels down out of bounds which would have caused a turnover. With Rasheed Wallace running at him trying to block the shot, Elliott arched the ball over Wallace's outstretched hand and into the basket with nine seconds left to give the Spurs an 86–85 lead. Portland failed to score in the remaining time, and the Spurs, who had trailed for the entire game prior to Elliott's basket, celebrated on the court.

Significance
The "Miracle" designation relates to the combination of circumstances involved:
 Elliott played with a serious kidney condition that required kidney transplant surgery and would likely have not been involved in the game had he gone through with the transplant surgery sooner.
 The Spurs trailed by 18 (52–34) early in the third quarter; more often than not, a lead like that holds up in a playoff game.
 The Spurs' last play succeeded despite a near steal by Stacey Augmon, near block by Wallace, and near turnover by Elliott.

Aftermath
The Spurs won the next two in Portland for a four-game sweep to win their first ever conference title (having lost four times since joining the NBA). In the 1999 NBA Finals, they beat the New York Knicks four games to one to win their first NBA title. The Spurs would compete for the Conference Finals in nine out of the next 18 years and make it to the NBA Finals five more times, winning all but once to spark a dynasty. As for Portland, they would appear in the Conference Finals the following year, but they ran into another team keen on building a legacy in the Los Angeles Lakers. The Lakers would beat them in seven games and Portland did not win another playoff series again until 2013 nor make the Conference Finals until 2019.

References

External links 
 NBA.com's Legendary Performances: Memorial Day Miracle

1998–99 NBA season
National Basketball Association playoff games
Portland Trail Blazers games
San Antonio Spurs games
May 1999 sports events in the United States
1999 in sports in Texas
20th century in San Antonio